Napoleon is a 1995 Australian family film directed by Mario Andreacchio, and written by Michael Bourchier, Mario Andreacchio, and Mark Saltzman  about a Golden retriever puppy who runs away from his city home to be a wild dog.

Plot 
In Sydney, Australia, a puppy named Muffin is living with a human family and his own mother. He, calling himself Napoleon and pretending to be tough, wishes that he could live with the wild dogs that he can hear howling in the distance. The family has a birthday party and one of the decorations is a basket with balloons strapped to it. Out of curiosity, Napoleon hops inside it, but it, untied from its tether, begins to float away.

Napoleon flies high above Sydney and heads out to the sea. A galah named Birdo drops down on the side of his basket and offers to help him get down. Birdo's idea of help is to pop the balloons suspending the basket, causing Napoleon to land unharmed on a beachhead. He thinks he can finally seek out the wild dogs and heads into a nearby forest, ignoring Birdo's suggestion to return home.

At night, Napoleon starts to fear being alone. A tawny frogmouth in the forest warns him of terrible things that can happen to pets in the wild, but he ignores him as well and continues on his way, briefly getting caught in the web of a spider. He discovers a large tree which is home to a psychotic cat. She spots Napoleon and, thinking he is a mouse, chases him. He escapes when the tawny frogmouth pushes the cat into a pond. The tawny frogmouth then warns him that she will not rest until he is dead. As he runs off, she pulls herself from the pond angrily swearing revenge.

The next morning, following an encounter with a flock of annoying rainbow lorikeets and then a rude koala, Napoleon once again meets with Birdo, asking him to teach him how to live in the wild, also revealing his real name is Muffin. He is then taunted for his name by both a deep-voiced green tree frog and the lorikeets from earlier, despite Birdo's attempts to stop them, and thereafter gets stranded on a floating log. Birdo agrees at last to teach Napoleon how to live in the wild, beginning by teaching him how to swim back to shore in a lake, pushing him off a floating log.

Napoleon learns about hunting by practicing on a group of rabbits, but fails to catch one and ends up eating moss instead. Birdo's next lessons about friendly and dangerous animals with a wombat and some heavily injured quokkas, having suffered a brutal attack by the cat, and then snowy weather are ignored. Napoleon narrowly avoids a herd of stampeding brumbies during the latter lesson, which Birdo mistakes for "blinding snow and freezing fog", which causes him to abandon Birdo in frustration. He follows the smell of what he believes to be sweets to a sugarcane field, though Birdo, fearing how dry it is, tries to stop him from going in it but to no avail. He briefly encounters a snake warning him of danger just before a bushfire breaks out, escaping with Birdo's help. The cat returns and attempts to attack Birdo, but fails. He reunites with his lost flock but she has found them too; Napoleon saves them with a warning of her. They come to a road where they witness a frill-necked lizard hiding on a road stripe survive a passing truck, as it angrily bullies Napoleon away when he tries to see if it's okay. He and Birdo then part ways as he wants to seek the wild dogs and Birdo wants to rejoin his flock.

Napoleon then helps an echidna find water and seeks out shade. While resting, he is heartbroken when he realises that the howling he has been hearing was just a perentie lizard wandering the desert and imitating various animals, and begins lamenting running away from home. A torrential rainstorm arrives as the area begins to flood, and Napoleon runs for shelter and discovers two dingo puppies named Sid and Nancy inside a damp cave, assuming they are lost like him. The water floods the cave and sweeps Nancy away. Napoleon dives in and rescues her. The pups' mother returns and Napoleon realises that he has found the wild dogs. She agrees to let him live with her for the time-being, Sid, and Nancy. While out together, she asks why he wanted to be with the wild dogs. He explains that he always wanted to feel brave by living in the wild, but confesses to being disappointed with the lifestyle. She comforts him by reminding him that it was his courage that led him out here and helped him save Sid and Nancy, which represents the true spirit of the wild dogs.

Wanting to go home, Napoleon takes a trip across the landscape in a kangaroo's pouch. He reaches the shore and discovers that his basket is inhabited by a feisty penguin who calls himself Conan, wanting to be a wild and brave creature, mirroring how Napoleon was when he first arrived. He learns however that Conan's real name is Pengi when his raucous family arrives. That night, Napoleon's plan to sail back to Sydney with the basket is interrupted by the cat's return. A fight erupts and he tries multiple times to stop her. Before she can kill him, she becomes distracted by Pengi, who taunts her. Napoleon then knocks her off the cliff and into the basket, which sails away. On a cliff side, Napoleon sees an image of a wild dog howling, symbolizing that he understands his bravery of being one inside.

Birdo reappears with a sea turtle who takes Napoleon back to Sydney. He returns home to his mother, who consents to calling him Napoleon instead of Muffin. The cat, having been carried to Sydney by the ocean currents, reappears one last time. She finally realises that Napoleon is not a mouse, but a dog instead. Regardless, she still vows to get him any way.

Voice cast

Production

The film was the most expensive independent production to be made in South Australia at the time of production.  Director Mario Andreacchio was inspired to make it after watching The Adventures of Milo and Otis with his children. During the shoot, 64 different dogs played the title role.

Songs

Original songs performed in the film include:

Release

The film grossed 275,152,249.53 rupees at the box office in Australia during 1995. In Japan, it opened on 87 screens during late February under the name Kulta, Finnish for "gold".  According to Andreacchio, the Japanese public mistook the original English title for a kind of brandy.

The film was released on VHS in the United States, with a different dub, on August 11, 1998 by Metro-Goldwyn-Mayer.

Reception

In the US, the film received no advance screenings for critics. It however received three stars out of four from the New York Daily News. Despite being a financial disappointment, it has received a cult following.

See also
 Cinema of Australia
 South Australian Film Corporation

References

External links 

Napoleon at Oz Movies

1990s adventure films
1995 films

Animal adventure films
1990s children's adventure films
Australian children's adventure films
Australian children's films
Australian buddy films
Films scored by Bill Conti
Films about dogs
Films about cats
Films about penguins
Films about rabbits and hares
Films about koalas
Films about kangaroos and wallabies
Films about wombats
Films about lizards
The Samuel Goldwyn Company films
Films shot in Flinders Ranges
Films set in Sydney
Films set in South Australia
Films set in Victoria (Australia)
Films set in the Outback
1990s children's films
Films directed by Mario Andreacchio
Films produced by Mario Andreacchio
1990s English-language films